The Solesmes Congregation is an association of monasteries within the Benedictine Confederation headed by the Abbey of Solesmes.

History
The congregation was founded in 1837 by Pope Gregory XVI as the French Benedictine Congregation, with the then newly reopened Solesmes Abbey, founded by Dom Prosper Guéranger, O.S.B., who wished to re-establish France's ancient and rich presence of monastic life, which had been wiped out by the French Revolution. The first foundation of the new congregation in 1853 was Ligugé Abbey, founded by St. Martin of Tours in 361. In course of time other daughterhouses were founded from Solesmes: in 1880 the Abbey of Santo Domingo de Silos in Spain, Glanfeuil in 1892, and Fontenelle in 1893. These four were old monasteries restored. The congregation's first monastery of women was St. Cecilia's Abbey, Solesmes, founded in 1866 by Guéranger and Cécile Bruyère.

Some of the monasteries of the congregation, specially in France, use the pre-conciliar Latin liturgy, and most of them focus on Gregorian chant. One of its abbeys, Santo Domingo de Silos Abbey, became internationally famous when an album its monks recorded in 1973, Chant, became a huge hit when re-released in 1994, peaking at #3 on the U.S. album charts.

List of houses

(with dates of establishment within the congregation)

Monks

Solesmes Abbey (1833)
Ligugé Abbey (1853)
Marseilles Priory, now Ganagobie Abbey (1856) 
Santo Domingo de Silos Abbey, Spain (1880)
 Wisques Abbey 1889
Sainte-Marie Abbey, Paris (1893)
St. Wandrille's Abbey (1894)
Clervaux Abbey, Luxembourg (1890)
Kergonan Abbey (1897)
St Benoît du Lac Abbey, Quebec (1912)
Quarr Abbey, England (1922)
Montserrat Priory, Madrid, 1939
Schoelcher Priory, Martinique 1947
Fontgombault Abbey, 1948
St. Benedictusberg Abbey, Netherlands, 1951
Leyre Abbey, Spain, 1954
Valle de los Caidos Abbey, Spain, 1958
Keur-Moussa Abbey, Senegal 1961
Randol Abbey, 1971
Triors Abbey, 1984
Gaussan Abbey, 1994
Palendriai Priory, Lithuania, 1998
Clear Creek Abbey, USA, 1999

Nuns

St. Cecilia's Abbey, Solesmes 1866
Wisques Abbey, 1889
 St. Michael's Abbey, Kergonan, 1898
Ste Marthe sur le Lac Abbey, Quebec 1936  
St Cecilia's Abbey, Ryde, England 1950
Keur-Guilaye Priory, Senegal 1970
Le Carbet Priory, Martinique 1977 
Monastery of the Immaculate Heart of Mary, USA, 1981

References

Sources
 Solesmes Congregation (website of Solesmes Abbey)

Benedictine congregations
Religious organizations established in 1837
1837 establishments in France